Alex Rosamilia (born 1982) is an American musician. Rosamilia is one of the founding members of the band The Gaslight Anthem. He plays lead guitar and provides backing vocals for the band.

Biography
Early in his career he was involved in The Killing Gift, which also included drummer Benny Horowitz, now of The Gaslight Anthem. Rosamilia has been the lead guitarist for The Gaslight Anthem since their formation in early 2006. With the band he has recorded five studio albums, Sink or Swim, The '59 Sound, American Slang, Handwritten, and Get Hurt.

He was also active in the band Spiro Agnew which is essentially The Killing Gift line-up without a vocalist.

In 2010, Rosamilia started the hardcore metal band Something About Death or Dying and released a five-song digital only E.P. on 11 November 2010 with Darrell Coco, bassist of Spiro Agnew, vocalist Dan Pelic, and drummer Wes Kleinknecht.

Rosamilia and Pelic worked together again to form another metal project dubbed Servitude in 2013 and released an E.P., "No Foxhole Prayers", in 2015. The band includes Brad Clifford (formerly of Poison The Well and Sincebyman) on second guitar, Corey Perez (of Ensign and I Am The Avalanche) on bass and drummer Eric Schnee (of Organ Dealer).

Discography
With The Gaslight Anthem
 Sink or Swim Demos (7" vinyl) (2006)
 Sink or Swim (2007)
 Señor and the Queen EP (CD & double 7" vinyl) (2008)
 The '59 Sound (2008)
 Live at Park Ave. EP (10" vinyl) (2009)
 American Slang (2010)
 Tumbling Dice / She Loves You EP (7" vinyl) (2010)
 Handwritten (2012)
 Get Hurt (2014)

With Something About Death or Dying
 Something About Death Or Dying Downloadable Demo (2010)

With The Killing Gift
 Who Watches the Watchmen? (2004)

With Servitude
 No Foxhole Prayers (2015)

References

Guitarists from New Jersey
Living people
The Gaslight Anthem members
1982 births
21st-century American guitarists
People from New Brunswick, New Jersey
American rock guitarists
American male guitarists